Michel Rateau (born 4 September 1938 in Paris, France) is a French composer.

Biography 
Michel Rateau began studying solfège and piano at the age of five at Notre Dame de France in Vanves, France. At the same age, he composed his first work in his parents' kitchen using everyday objects.

Rateau attended a number of music courses throughout his childhood, studying under Sister Marie-Laurent up to the age of 11; then taking private piano courses with the organist Jean Boguet up to the age of 15. He then attended the classes of Jacques Février and Jean Doyen.

Attracted to Composition, Rateau enrolled in the Conservatoire de Paris in 1959. He attended the classes of André Jolivet and Jean Rivier and begin studying under the supervision of the CNSM Professor of Harmony, Maurice Duruflé.  He passed the Musical Education, CAPES (upper national teaching diploma) in 1960 and carried out National Military Service in the Band of the 93rd Infantry Regiment at Mont Valerien from 1962 to 1964.

Rateau was awarded the First Prize of Harmony in 1963 and the First Prize of Composition in 1966 from Paris CNSM. In 1967 he won Premier Grand Prix de Rome, a French national upper artistic award allowing the winner to spend time at the Villa Medici in Rome, Italy.

Rataeu lived at the Villa Medici from 1968 to 1971. Shortly after his return to Paris, he turned his focus to sounds emitted by unconventional instruments (such as bird cage, pipes, and tanks) and recorded them on magnetic tapes. This led to the score of “’La Course’” (The race) a ballet for the Paris Théâtre National Populaire (TNP) performed by Joseph Russillo’s company and a concert at the Musée d'Art Moderne de la Ville de Paris within the frame of the A.R.C. (Animation, Research, Confrontation) ordered by Maurice Fleuret. Throughout these years, Rateau continued to compose orchestral scores.

As reported by Billboard in 1975, Rateau instigated a new musical style founded on what the composer called "sounds of nature and every-day life". The report said "he has recorded the sounds of printing machines, car engines, pots and pans, garden tools, and claims it is not musique concrete but music composed and arranged on tape by the elements producing the sound."

In 1976, Rateau settled in Rouen, and resumed his teaching activities at the Rouen IUFM (Institut Universitaire de Formation des Maîtres – i.e. University Institute for Teachers' Training). He also taught at the Rouen Institute of Musicology from 1980 to 1989 and at the École Normale de Musique de Paris from 1983 to 1990, as a teacher of harmony and analysis.

In 1982 Rateau started the “Chants du Temps” (Time songs) for orchestra which he finished in 1988.

While teaching full-time, he had “Offrande Lyrique” (Lyrical offering) for violin and orchestra played in concert at the Salle Gaveau in Paris in 1984 by Ensemble orchestral de Paris (The Paris orchestral group) conducted by Jean-Pierre Wallez with Gaëtane Prouvost as a solo violin. To his joy, Maestros Olivier Messiaen and Henri Dutilleux attended this concert. The Rouen Chamber Orchestra played this work again in 1984, conducted by Jean-Pierre Berlingen.

For the 25th anniversary of Rouen University in 1991, he composed a “quatre” for flute, clarinet, violin and piano for the Nouvel ensemble Contemporain (The New Contemporary group), created in concert in 1991.

In 1992 Rateau began “Les Chants du Temps” for the piano, his Journal Musical (Musical Diary), “a work in progress of unachievement”. “Chants du Temps”  returned  to a very simple, quite purified, strongly melodic, and contrapuntal form of writing, which contrasts radically with the pioneering pieces he wrote in 1960-1970. It consists of a modulable composition in fifteen volumes, each volume enclosing twelve books and each book containing twelve pages of music. Like a collection of poems, according to his mood and his preferences, the reader-interpreter will choose pieces to be read or played without restraint.

Part of the “Chants du Temps”  was played in concert at the University of Strasbourg in April 2005, on the occasion of the Cultural Action Days. The Israeli pianist Gilead Mishory has played some extracts of this work in concert in Germany and Japan.

List of works 
 “Copeaux de lune” (Moon chips), for two pianos - Paris Biennal, Musée d'Art Moderne de la Ville de Paris - 1966 (Editions Billaudot) - duration : 11 minutes.
 “Divertimento”, for two pianos - 1st prize of composition, Paris CNSM - 1966 - duration : 13 minutes 30 seconds
 “Voyageur où t’en vas-tu ?” (Traveller, where are you going ?), Cantata on a poem of Rabindranath Tagore, for soprano, tenor, baritone, bass and orchestra - Paris Opera Orchestra, Institut de France - 1967 - duration : 25 minutes
 “Divertimento Breve”, for orchestra – RAI Symphonic orchestra, Rome, 1968 - duration : 5 minutes 30 seconds
 “Seuil”  (Threshold), for a set of percussions - The RAI (television) percussions, Rome - 1969 - Work retransmitted on France Musique - duration: 10 minutes 30 seconds
 “Concerto”, for orchestra - the RAI (television) orchestra, Rome - 1970 - duration: 12 minutes
 “Sonnant” (Sounding), for Orchestra - order from Radio France - 1971 - duration: 12 minutes
 “Trois musiques  pour un citoyen” ( Three musics for a citizen), for orchestra - order from Radio France - 1972 - Editions Billaudot - transcription for two pianos - duration: 18 minutes
 Music on magnetic tape :
 “La Course”  (The Race), music for ballet represented at the Paris Théâtre National Populaire (TNP) by the Joseph Russillo’s company retransmitted on the television - 1970 - duration: 26 minutes
 “Cage”, “Tuiles”, “Outils de jardin”, “Tubulure”, “Mécaniques” (Cage, Tiles, Garden tools, Pipe, Mechanics) : musics played in concert at the Musée d'Art Moderne de la Ville de Paris - 1975 - duration: 45 minutes
 “Enfances” (Childhoods) (15’), “Flûtes” (Flutes) (7’20), “Cloches” (Bells) (5’40), “Tintamarresque et Farce” (Noise and trick) (12’), “Concerto pour guitare” (Concerto for guitar) (25’), “Couvercles” (Covers) (4’30), “Pièces de voitures” (Car spare parts) (5’30), “Eléments de cuisine avec piano” (Kitchen elements with piano) (6’30), “La Bête” (The Beast) (2’40), “Temps-Monde” (Time-World) (13’) - 1973-1976
 “Matinale”  (Morning) (3’30), for flute and piano, “Sonnant” (Sounding) (3’10), for trumpet and piano - Instrumental piece ordered by A. Leduc Publisher, 1972
  Piece for Paris CNSM competitive examination :
 “Fiction” for horn and piano - M.Eschig Publisher - 1974 - duration : 5 minutes
 “Dialogue avec l’oiseau La” (Dialogue with the A Bird) for flute and piano - M.Eschig Publisher - 1975 - duration : 5 minutes
 “Nature morte à la contrebasse” (Still-life with contrabass) - Salabert Publisher - 1981 -duration: 5 minutes
 “Comme Union” (Like Union) for brass quintet - Order from ARS NOVA, Conducted by Marius Constant - 1979 - duration: 15 minutes
 “Lumen” for strings - Rouen Chamber Orchestra, conducted by Jean-Claude Bernède - 1980 - duration: 20 minutes
 “Offrande Lyrique” (Lyrical offering) for violin and orchestra - ordered by the Paris Orchestral Group - 1981 - duration: 18 minutes
 “Chants du Temps” (Time songs) in four books for orchestra - 1982-1988 - duration: 1 hour 50 minutes
 “Audite” for orchestra - 1989 - duration: 11 minutes
 “Intervalle” (Interval) for strings - 1990 - duration : 5 minutes 30 seconds
 “Ephphata” for orchestra - 1990 – duration : 7 minutes
 “Musique Geste Mouvement” (Music Gesture Movement) for two pianos - 1990 - duration: 13 minutes 30 seconds
 “A quatre” (At four) for flute, clarinet, violin and piano - Created in concert by the New Contemporary Group on the 25th anniversary of Rouen University - 1991 - duration: 8 minutes 30 secondes
 “Chants du temps” (Time songs) for strings and wind instruments - 2007 - duration 40 minutes
 “Les Chants du Temps” (Time songs) for piano, « Work in course of unachievement » - started in 1992 - total duration : about 20 hours - 16th volume in progress

References

1938 births
Living people
French classical composers
French male classical composers
French music educators
20th-century classical composers
21st-century classical composers
Prix de Rome for composition
Musicians from Paris
Conservatoire de Paris alumni
Academic staff of the École Normale de Musique de Paris
20th-century French composers
21st-century French composers
20th-century French male musicians
21st-century French male musicians